Corynebacterium urealyticum is a bacterial species of the genus Corynebacterium. It is not commonly found in healthy people. It is, however, an important isolate when found in conjunction with a urinary tract infection. In contrast to acid-producing bacteria like Escherichia coli, C. urealyticum, as the name implies, secretes the enzyme urease which can be strong enough to make urine alkaline. This can lead to the formation of struvite calculi or renal stones. Risk factors associated with this bacterium include immunosuppression, underlying genitourinary disorders, and antibiotic therapy.  There are other urease-producing corynebacteria that are associated with urinary tract infections, but C. urealyticum is the most common.

References

External links
Type strain of Corynebacterium urealyticum at BacDive -  the Bacterial Diversity Metadatabase

Corynebacterium
Bacteria described in 1992